The 2022 North Dakota Senate elections were held on November 8, 2022, as part of the biennial 2022 United States elections. Thirty-two of the seats in the North Dakota State Senate were up for election. Primary elections were held on June 14, 2022. The elections coincided with elections for other offices in North Dakota, including the US Senate, US House, North Dakota Secretary of State, North Dakota Attorney General, and the North Dakota House of Representatives.
 
Following the 2022 elections, Republicans expanded their supermajority by three seats, giving them a 43-to-4 member advantage over Democrats.

Retirements

Democrats
District 23: Joan Heckaman retired.

Republicans
District 3: Oley Larsen retired.
District 7: Nicole Poolman retired.
District 8: Howard Anderson retired.
District 26: Jason Heitkamp retired to run for state representative.
District 37: Rich Wardner retired.

Predictions

Defeated Incumbents

Primary Election
District 15: Republican incumbent Dave Oehlke was defeated in the Republican primary election by Judy Estenson.
District 20: Republican incumbent Robert Fors was defeated in the Republican primary election by fellow Republican incumbent Randy Lemm. Both incumbents had been redrawn into the same district following redistricting.
District 33: Republican incumbent Jessica Unruh-Bell was defeated in the Republican primary election by Keith Boehm.

General Election
District 9: Democratic incumbent Richard Marcellais was defeated in the general election by Republican Kent Weston.
District 35: Democratic incumbent Tracy Potter was defeated in the general election by Republican Sean Cleary.
District 43: Democratic incumbent JoNell Bakke was defeated in the general election by Republican Jeff Barta.

Summary of Results by State Senate District
Districts not listed were not up for election in 2022.

Primary Election Results Source:

General Election Results Source:

Close races 
Districts where the margin of victory was under 10%:

Detailed results

Primary Election Results Source:

General Election Results Source:
Note: If a primary election is not listed, then there was not a competitive primary in that district (i.e., only one candidate filed to run).

District 1
General election

District 3
General election

District 5
General election

District 6
General election

District 7
General election

District 8
Republican primary

General election

District 9
Democartic primary

General election

District 10
General election

District 11
General election

District 13
General election

District 15
Republican primary

General election

District 17
General election

District 19
General election

District 20
Republican primary

General election

District 21
General election

District 23
General election

District 25
General election

District 26
General election

District 27
General election

District 28
Republican primary

General election

District 29
General election

District 31
General election

District 33
Republican primary

General election

District 35
Republican primary

General election

District 36
General election

District 37
General election

District 39
Republican primary

General election

District 41
General election

District 43
General election

District 44
General election

District 45
General election

District 47
General election

References 

North Dakota Senate elections
North Dakota Senate
Senate